Bédiala is a town in west-central Ivory Coast. It is a sub-prefecture and commune of Daloa Department in Haut-Sassandra Region, Sassandra-Marahoué District.

In 2021, the population of the sub-prefecture of Bédiala was 84,474.

Villages
The 16 villages of the sub-prefecture of Bédiala and their population in 2014 are:

Notes

Sub-prefectures of Haut-Sassandra
Communes of Haut-Sassandra